Fighter's Paradise is a 1924 American film starring Snowy Baker as a man mistaken for a boxer.

References

External links

Fighter's Paradise at TCMDB

1924 films
1924 drama films
Silent American drama films
American black-and-white films
American silent feature films
1920s American films